The 1922 Butler Bulldogs football team represented Butler University during the 1922 college football season.

Schedule

References

Butler
Butler Bulldogs football seasons
Butler Bulldogs football